The Clásica Jaén Paraíso Interior is an elite men's professional road bicycle racing event held in the Province of Jaén, Spain.

Its first edition was held in 2022, being part of the UCI Europe Tour, with a 1.1 classification. The race in this edition started from the city of Baeza and had the finish line in the city center of Úbeda. The organisers designed a race with several gravel sectors across olive trees, and a steep finish between the Renaissance palaces of Úbeda, having a direct inspiration in the gravel and Siena finish of the Italian race Strade Bianche.

Winners

References

External links 
  

Cycle races in Spain
UCI Europe Tour races
Sport in Jaén, Spain
2022 establishments in Spain
Clásica Jaén Paraíso Interior